The 1957 Pacific Southwest Championships was a combined men's and women's amateur tennis tournament played on outdoor hard courts at the Los Angeles Tennis Club in Los Angeles, California in the United States. It was the 31st edition of the tournament and took place from September 13 through September 22, 1957. Vic Seixas and Althea Gibson won the singles titles.

Finals

Men's singles
 Vic Seixas  defeated  Gilbert Shea 9–7, 6–3, 6–4

Women's singles
 Althea Gibson defeated  Louise Brough 6–3, 6–1

Men's doubles
 Ashley Cooper /  Neale Fraser defeated  Budge Patty /  Vic Seixas 3–6, 5–7, 13–11, 13–11, 6–3

Women's doubles
 Althea Gibson /  Darlene Hard defeated  Mary Bevis Hawton /  Janet Hopps 6–2, 6–4

Mixed doubles
 Mary Bevis Hawton /  Robert Howe defeated  Darlene Hard /  Mike Davies 6–3, 6–4

References

Los Angeles Open (tennis)
Pacific Southwest Championships
Pacific Southwest Championships